Pseudostellaria sierrae is a species of flowering plant in the family Caryophyllaceae known by the common name Sierra starwort.

Description
It is a perennial herb growing from a rhizome network with vertical, thick-tipped roots. The stem is hairless and grows up to about 27 centimeters in maximum height. The lance-shaped leaves are up to 3 centimeters long and hairless but rough along the edges.

The inflorescence is a solitary flower at the tip of the stem, or arising from an upper leaf axil. The flower has five white petals, each with a sharp, narrow notch in the tip. There are five long stamens with yellow anthers.

Distribution
It is endemic to California, where it is known only from the woodlands and forests of the Sierra Nevada. It was first collected before 1900 but not described to science until 2002.

References

External links
Jepson Manual Treatment
USDA Plants Profile
Flora of North America
California Native Plant Society Rare Plant Profile
Photo gallery

sierrae
Endemic flora of California
Flora of the Sierra Nevada (United States)
Plants described in 2002
Flora without expected TNC conservation status